Richard Mathias Miller (April 26, 1958 – January 11, 2014) was an American professional basketball player. He was a 6'6" (198 cm) 215 lb (98 kg) small forward and played collegiately at the University of Toledo from 1976 to 1980. He played a handful of games in the National Basketball Association (NBA).

Miller was selected with the 17th pick of the second round in the 1980 NBA Draft by the Indiana Pacers. He played 5 games for the Pacers and another 3 games for the Utah Jazz in 1980-81.

Death
Dick Miller died Jan. 11 in a Romulus, Mich., hotel of an apparent heart attack. He was 55.

References

External links
NBA stats @ basketballreference.com
Dick Miller profile @ thedraftreview.com
Dick Miller; 1958-2014: UT basketball star was in sales

1958 births
2014 deaths
American expatriate basketball people in Spain
American men's basketball players
Anchorage Northern Knights players
Basketball players at the 1979 Pan American Games
Basketball players from Milwaukee
CB Valladolid players
Indiana Pacers draft picks
Indiana Pacers players
Medalists at the 1979 Pan American Games
Montana Golden Nuggets players
Pan American Games gold medalists for the United States
Pan American Games medalists in basketball
Small forwards
Toledo Rockets men's basketball players
Utah Jazz players